Chiyar (also Romanized as Chīyar) is a village in Zanjanrud-e Bala Rural District, in the Central District of Zanjan County, Zanjan Province, Iran. At the 2006 census, its population was 623, in 165 families.

References 

Populated places in Zanjan County